Dimethylpiperidine may refer to:

2,6-Dimethylpiperidine
3,5-Dimethylpiperidine